Ahun (also Romanized as Āhūn) is a village in Jakdan Rural District, in the Central District of Bashagard County, Hormozgan Province, Iran. At the 2006 census, its population was 956, in 227 families.

References 

Populated places in Bashagard County